Stratford is a town in Garvin County, Oklahoma, United States. Prior to Oklahoma statehood in 1907, the town existed under different names and was in the Chickasaw Nation in a geographic region known as Indian Territory. Peach orchards abound in and around the town. The population was 1,525 at the 2010 census.

History

Stratford was originally the town of McGee, which was established in 1891. At the time, it was part of Pickens County, Chickasaw Nation in an unorganized geographic region of the United States known as Indian Territory In 1906 the Oklahoma Central Railroad built the railroad two miles south of McGee. The town placed its buildings on wagons and wheeled them down to the train tracks. The new town was first named Walling, but by October 1906 the name was changed to Stratford. Stratford is known as the Peach Capital of the World and holds its Peach Festival, annual rodeo, and car show the third Saturday each July. The festival has been held since 1976, while the rodeo dates back to 1936.

Geography
Stratford is situated approximately halfway between Pauls Valley and Ada along State Highway 19, where it intersects U.S. Highway 177. Its geographic coordinates are  (34.796077, -96.960342).

There are more than 400 acres of peach orchards in and around the town.

Stratford has frequent variations in weather daily and seasonally, except during the consistently hot summer months. Consistent winds during the summer help temper the hotter weather. Consistent northerly winds during the winter can intensify cold periods.

Demographics

As of the census of 2010, there were 1,525 people, 609 households, and 408 families residing in the town. There were 728 housing units. The racial makeup of the town was 78.3% White, 0.5% African American, 15.5% Native American, 0.9% from other races, and 4.3% from two or more races. Hispanic or Latino of any race were 2.7% of the population.

There were 609 households, out of which 32.8% had children under the age of 18 living with them, 43.0% were married couples living together, 16.7% had a female householder with no husband present, and 33.0% were non-families. 29.1% of all households were made up of individuals, and 13.1% had someone living alone who was 65 years of age or older. The average household size was 2.50 and the average family size was 3.09.

In the town, the population was spread out, with 24.7% under the age of 15, 12.9% from 15 to 24, 25.8% from 25 to 44, 21.4% from 45 to 64, and 15.3% who were 65 years of age or older. The median age was 33.9 years. For every 100 females, there were 85.5 males. For every 100 females age 18 and over, there were 81.1 males.

The median income for a household in the town was $23,581, and the median income for a family was $28,690. Males had a median income of $29,118 versus $22,629 for females. The per capita income for the town was $14,141. About 31.9% of families and 27.8% of the population were below the poverty line, including 46.0% of those under age 18 and 10.7% of those age 65 or over.

Notable person
 B. Kevin Turner, former COO of Microsoft and Walmart executive

See also
Garvin County, Oklahoma

References

External links
 http://stratfordok.org/index.html

Towns in Garvin County, Oklahoma
Towns in Oklahoma